JoAnna García Swisher (née García; born August 10, 1979) is an American actress. She is known for her roles as Sam in Are You Afraid of the Dark? (1994–96), Vicki Appleby in Freaks and Geeks (1999–2000), and Cheyenne Hart-Montgomery on The WB/CW sitcom Reba (2001–07). She has also gained popularity with her acting roles in Privileged (2008–09), Better with You (2010–11), Animal Practice (2012), Once Upon a Time (2013–18), The Astronaut Wives Club (2015), and Sweet Magnolias (2020-present). García also stars as Lindsey Johnson in Hallmark Channel's As Luck Would Have It (2021).

Early life
García was born in Tampa, Florida, to Loraine, a homemaker and former elementary school teacher of Spanish descent, and Jay García (1945-2019), a gynecologist from Cuba. She has one brother, Michael García. She began performing at age 10 when she auditioned for a local theater production and landed the lead. 

Disney Channel discovered her, but her parents put school first and she acted in local plays to keep up with her passion. She was the homecoming queen at Florida's Tampa Catholic High School.

Career
While in Florida, García guest starred in seaQuest DSV, Second Noah, and Superboy and several movies of the week. While attending high school, she was re-discovered by Nickelodeon and starred for three seasons as Samantha on Are You Afraid of the Dark?. She commuted from Florida to Montreal, Canada, where the show was filmed. She was cast at the age of fifteen on the 1994 television drama Party of Five, playing the recurring character Hallie. She had a recurring role on Freaks and Geeks (1999–2000) portraying the character of Vicki Appleby, the popular freshman cheerleader who spent seven minutes in heaven with the ultimate geek, Bill Haverchuck (Martin Starr). She then briefly attended college at Florida State University where she was a member of the Delta Delta Delta sorority, but later quit school to pursue acting full-time, moving to Los Angeles, California.

García went on to portray the character of Cheyenne Hart-Montgomery, Reba's (Reba McEntire) oldest daughter on The WB/CW sitcom Reba (2001–07). She was featured on the short-lived CBS comedy Welcome to the Captain. Beginning in the fall of 2008, she starred as Megan Smith in the CW series Privileged (originally known as How to Survive the Filthy Rich). On the big screen, García was seen in the comedy spoof Not Another Teen Movie. She has also appeared in the original television movies From the Earth to the Moon (1998) and Love's Deadly Triangle: The Texas Cadet Murder (1997). She also appeared in the ABC Family original movie The Initiation of Sarah, which premiered in October 2006. In 2008, she had a role in A Very Merry Daughter of the Bride, playing Roxanne. She had a leading role in the ABC Family TV movie Revenge of the Bridesmaids.

In 2009, García had a recurring role on The CW drama Gossip Girl playing the role of Bree Buckley, an irreverent evil Miss America-type who is politically progressive but from a conservative Southern family. She appeared in four episodes in season three. In December 2009, she guest starred as Maggie, Ted Mosby's college buddy on How I Met Your Mother.

García starred in the ABC sitcom Better with You. The show centers on two sisters who were at different points in their romantic relationships: one was unmarried and in a long-term relationship, and the other (García) got married after getting pregnant from a one-night stand. It was canceled on May 13, 2011.

Garcia guest-starred on The Penguins of Madagascar in the episode "The Officer X Factor/Love Hurts", which aired on February 12, 2011.  In 2012, Garcia appeared in four episodes of the USA Network dramedy Royal Pains as a nephrologist treating Jack O'Malley (Tom Cavanagh). In 2013, during season three of the series Once Upon a Time she began playing the recurring role of the Ariel from The Little Mermaid.

Personal life

In 2008, García became engaged to Trace Ayala, the personal assistant and childhood friend of Justin Timberlake who co-founded the clothing company William Rast.

In August 2009, People magazine reported that García was dating baseball player Nick Swisher. They became engaged in May 2010, and married on December 11, 2010, at the Breakers Hotel & Resort in Palm Beach, Florida. Bridesmaids for García included friends and fellow actresses Jamie-Lynn Sigler, Melissa Peterman, and Reba McEntire. Since her marriage, she has been credited as Joanna García Swisher. They have two daughters, one born in 2013 and the other in 2016.

Garcia is a devout Catholic.

Causes and interests
García volunteers as a teacher for children who are learning English as a second language. She is involved with the organization Make the Commitment, whose purpose is to raise awareness about cervical cancer.  She has an organization called We Reach, a charity which has assembled an advisory board in the entertainment industry to help young girls around the country organize charity events in their hometowns. The charity also has the goal of empowering young women.

Filmography

Film

Television

Accolades

References

External links

 
 JoAnna Garcia at Country Music Television

20th-century American actresses
21st-century American actresses
Actresses from Tampa, Florida
American child actresses
American educators
American entertainers of Cuban descent
American film actresses
American people of Spanish descent
American stage actresses
American television actresses
American Roman Catholics
Catholics from Florida
Florida State University alumni
Hispanic and Latino American actresses
Living people
University of Florida alumni
1979 births
Baseball players' wives and girlfriends